Phosphinous acid (or Phosphinol) is the inorganic compound with the formula H2POH. It exists, fleetingly, as a mixture with its less stable tautomer H3PO (phosphine oxide).  This mixture has been generated by low temperature oxidation of phosphine with ozone. H2POH is mainly of pedagogical interest.  Organophosphinous acids are more prevalent than the parent H2POH.

Organophosphinous acids
Phosphinous acids exist mainly as minor tautomers of secondary phosphine oxides.  For example diphenylphosphinous acid, which is not detectable directly, is invoked as the tautomer of diphenylphosphine oxide.  

Highly electron-withdrawing substituents stabilize the phosphinous acid tautomer as illustrated by (CF3)2POH.

References

Functional groups